Francesc Ricomá de Castellarnau (Tarragona, Spain, 27 January 1960) is a Spanish teacher and politician who belongs to the People's Party (PP), the main opposition party since the 2004 General Election.

Married with two daughters, Ricomá gained a diploma in Labour relations and subsequently worked as a technical adviser to the Spanish National Statistics Institute. He was first elected to the Spanish Congress of Deputies at the 1993 General Election representing Tarragona Province and was re-elected in the subsequent elections in 1996, 2000, 2004 and 2008. He served as a local councillor in Tarragona from 1996 to 1999, where he headed the PP group on the council.

References

Members of the 5th Congress of Deputies (Spain)
Members of the 6th Congress of Deputies (Spain)
Members of the 7th Congress of Deputies (Spain)
Members of the 8th Congress of Deputies (Spain)
Members of the 9th Congress of Deputies (Spain)
1960 births
Living people
People from Tarragona
Politicians from Catalonia
People's Party (Spain) politicians